The Karlsruhe Stadtbahn is a German tram-train system combining tram lines in the city of Karlsruhe with railway lines in the surrounding countryside, serving the entire region of the middle upper Rhine valley and creating connections to neighbouring regions. The Stadtbahn combines an efficient urban railway in the city with an S-Bahn (suburban railway), overcoming the boundary between trams and trains. Its logo does not include the green and white S-Bahn symbol used in other German suburban rail systems and the symbol is only used at stops and stations outside the inner-city tram-operation area.

The idea to link tram and railway lines with one another in order to be able to offer an attractive transport system for town and outskirts was developed in Karlsruhe and implemented gradually in the 1980s and 1990s, with the system commencing operation in 1992.  This idea, known as the Karlsruhe model or tram-train, has been adapted by other European cities.

The Karlsruhe Stadtbahn is operated in co-operation by Albtal-Verkehrs-Gesellschaft (Alb valley transport corporation, AVG), Verkehrsbetriebe Karlsruhe (Karlsruhe transport authority, VBK) and Deutsche Bahn (DB). The two urban transport operators, VBK and AVG, operate most services, while DB is responsible for the sections from Pforzheim and Bretten to Bietigheim-Bissingen.

Network
The Karlsruhe Stadtbahn includes thirteen lines, in four different forms:
Tram lines under the German law regulating tram operations, in a modernised form with a large proportion of segregated track and priority at traffic lights.  These lines are electrified at 750 V DC:Stadtbahn Line S2 (operated by VBK in addition to its own seven tram lines).
A combination of tram line sections within urban Karlsruhe and the secondary lines of the AVG, electrified at 750 V DC: Stadtbahn Lines S1 and S11.
A combination of tram line sections within urban Karlsruhe, Wörth am Rhein, Bad Wildbad and Heilbronn, electrified at 750 V DC, and the railway lines of the DB and AVG, electrified at 15 kV AC, 16.7 Hz: Stadtbahn Lines S4, S41, S42, S5, S51, S52, S6, S7 and S8.
Pure rail operations on DB and AVG tracks, electrified at 15 kV AC: Stadtbahn Lines S31, S32, S71, S81 and S9.

Lines

S-Bahn line S3 between Germersheim, Speyer, Ludwigshafen, Mannheim, Heidelberg and Bruchsal and Karlsruhe is controlled by RheinNeckar S-Bahn, not by the Karlsruhe Stadtbahn. It is operated by DB Regio with Class 425 EMUs.

History

Karlsruhe attempted to create a network of street and interurban tram lines for the development of the surrounding countryside, modelled on the Oberrheinische Eisenbahn-Gesellschaft.  However, by the middle of the twentieth century there had been little lasting achievement due to the difficult economic times in between.

Acquisition and extension of the Alb Valley Railway
The acquisition of the Alb Valley Railway (Albtalbahn) by the city of Karlsruhe, the establishment of AVG and the integration of the Alb Valley Railway cross-country line into the Karlsruhe tram system between 1957 and 1966 formed the foundation for the later Stadtbahn network. The Alb Valley Railway was connected to the tram system and electrified as a tramway, so that modified trams could run through between the southern outskirts and Karlsruhe city centre.

The success of the Alb Valley Railway encouraged the Karlsruhe planners in the 1960s to connect the northern surrounding outskirts by a modern tram/stadbahn system as well. For this it negotiated with Deutsche Bundesbahn to use the Hardt Railway (Karlsruhe-Neureut-Eggenstein-Leopoldshafen), sharing with the local goods traffic, and reached an agreement at the end of the 1970s.  After building a connecting line between the tram network and the railway line in 1979 the tram service shared the railway line for 2 km to Neureut, where the few remaining goods trains left the line.  In 1986 and 1989 the Stadbahn was extended north to Leopoldshafen and Linkenheim-Hochstetten and to the Forschungszentrum Karlsruhe, again sharing existing railway tracks.  Since the remaining goods traffic was hauled by diesel locomotives, the electrification of the line with the tramway’s 750 V DC system did not cause technical problems.

Line B: introduction of tram-trains

Apart from the Stadtbahn line Hochstetten–Karlsruhe–Alb Valley (formerly line A, since 1994 lines S1/S11), a further Stadtbahn line, S2 (Stutensee-Karlsruhe-Rheinstetten), was built in stages between 1989 and 2006, extending an existing city tram line.  This line connects the northeast with the southwest suburbs.  This line included single-track sections in the main streets of the local centres of Blankenloch, Forchheim and Mörsch. This route through the centres was preferred to a route on the edge of these localities or in a tunnel because it was seen as promoting development.

While the development of the lines to the nearby northern and southern municipalities could be achieved by use of the Alb Valley and Hardt Railway and by building new tram lines, this was not true of the eastern suburbs.  Therefore, shared operations over the existing railway lines was considered, although they were electrified, at least in sections, with the 15 kV system of the main-line railway.  After development of a Stadtbahn vehicle, with the electrical systems of both trams and railways, that could be operated under both the tram and rail regulations, lengthy negotiations with DB were required (well before rail reform legally permitted access by other rail operators to Germany’s rail infrastructure) before it was agreed that the Karlsruhe Stadtbahn could share the Karlsruhe–Bretten line.

In 1992, Stadtbahn operations between Karlsruhe and Bretten-Gölshausen started on the Kraichgau Railway (then line B, now S4).  The tram and rail networks were linked by building a connecting line between Durlacher Allee and Grötzingen station.  This connecting line also contains the equipment that controls the change between the two electrification systems.

Extension of the network 

The unexpected success of the new Stadtbahn line between Karlsruhe and Bretten (passenger numbers increased fivefold in just a few weeks) led to an accelerated development of the Stadtbahn system in the 1990s.  The modernisation and integration of additional lines resulted in the following extensions:
 1994: to Baden-Baden via Durmersheim and Rastatt as preliminary service via DB tracks, to Bruchsal via Weingarten; Bretten - Bruchsal
 1996: Bruchsal to Menzingen; Karlsruhe inner city to Baden-Baden via Rastatt
 1997: to Pforzheim via Pfinztal; Bretten to Eppingen/Wörth
 1998: Bruchsal to Odenheim
 1999: Bretten to Mühlacker; Pforzheim to Bietigheim-Bissingen; Eppingen to Heilbronn central station (Hauptbahnhof)
 2001: Heilbronn central station (Hauptbahnhof) to Heilbronn city centre (new construction)
 2002: Rastatt to Forbach on the Murg Valley Railway; Pforzheim to Bad Wildbad
 2003: Forbach to Freudenstadt on the Murg Valley Railway; Bad Wildbad town tram line (new construction)
 2004: Baden-Baden to Achern
 2005: Heilbronn to Öhringen
 2006: Blankenloch to Spöck; Freudenstadt central station (Hauptbahnhof) to Eutingen im Gäu
 2010: Wörth to Germersheim

The Karlsruher Stadtbahn is 507 km long with over 120 trains. The longest line (S4) runs from Karlsruhe Albtalbahnhof to Öhringen and takes three hours.

Rolling stock 

Stadtbahn cars of the Karlsruhe type have been used since 1983 (such as class GT6-80C). The fleet includes 60 single-current vehicles for the direct current services only and operate on lines S1, S11 and S2. This type was derived from the Stadtbahnwagen B. 40 vehicles are 38 m-long 8-axle cars, while the remaining 20 6-axle cars are 28 m-long.

An 8-axle two-system car of the design GT8-100C/2S was developed for services running under a mixture of DC and AC lines from the DC vehicles, and 36 examples were supplied between 1991 and 1995. As technology advanced the follow-up design GT8-100D/2S-M was developed in 1997 and 85 vehicles were delivered up to 2005, carrying the numbers 837–922. In the autumn of 2009, 30 new two-car Flexity Swift sets were ordered, with an option for a further 45 sets. To bridge the bottleneck in deliveries at the end of 2009 three Flexity Link sets were borrowed from the Saarbahn.

In the two-area system served by the GT8-100D/2S-M Flexity Swift vehicles, 55 cm high platforms were built to provide step-free entrances. These were mostly built on the newer line (especially the Murg Valley, Enz Valley, the line to Odenheim and the Kraichgau line to Eppingen) while the older routes have been only been sporadically raised to this height. The Rhine-Neckar S-Bahn on the other hand, uses 76 cm high platforms for accessibility on the Durlach–Bruchsal section, but only at Durlach and Bruchsal stations. These stations have been equipped with the conversion to S-Bahn operations with platforms of heights of both 55 and 76 cm.

The older two-system and all single-system high-floor Stadtbahn vehicles do not offer barrier-free entry. These trains run on line S 2, but alternate with low-floor vehicles of class GT6-70D/N or GT8-70D/N which are also operated on most urban tram lines and provide accessible entrance at the 34 cm high platforms. The single-system Stadtbahn vehicles are to be replaced by low-floor vehicles by 2016 in preparation for the opening of the Stadtbahn tunnel being built in central Karlsruhe. The tender for these vehicles is being prepared.

There are currently a few stops in Karlsruhe city with platforms providing level access to two-system vehicles (such as those used on lines S 4 and S 5). The Stadtbahn tunnel will have platforms that are up to 80 m long with a height of 34 cm, which are raised to a height of 55 cm for a length of 15 metres to give step-free access to the first two doors of two-system trains.

Planned works 
The extensive development of the network into the 1990s opened all of Karlsruhe’s surrounding countryside.  The proposed urban tramways in Bruchsal, Rastatt, Baden-Baden and Landau failed to proceed, however, because of the political resistance of local politicians.  A separate network, the Stadtbahn Heilbronn, is planned in the Heilbronn area to link with line S4.

Few lines have been opened so far to the area west of the Rhine, the Vorderpfalz (eastern Palatinate).  This area has a lower population density, has closer connections to Mannheim and Ludwigshafen and the railways connecting it to Karlsruhe are not electrified.

New tunnel in Karlsruhe 

A tunnel is being built in central Karlsruhe, which will be used in the future by Stadtbahn lines S 1 / S 11, S 2, S 4 / S 41 and S 5 / S 51 / S 52 and various tram lines. The tunnel will be built under Durlacher Allee and Kaiserstraße with a junction under Marktplatz connecting to a tunnel under Ettlinger Straße. The tunnel ramps to be built in the area of today's stops of Mühlburger Tor, Gottesauer Platz and Augartenstraße; the new stations to replace these stops will be installed above ground at the end of the ramps. A new stop will be built for tram line 3 in Grashofstrasse at Mühlburger Tor as the line branches off there; the new stop will not be used by Stadtbahn trains. The Herrenstraße stop in the pedestrian zone is to be closed without replacement.

The tunnel will shorten the travel time for the Stadtbahn through the pedestrian zone and the stability of the timetable will improve. In addition, the platforms of the station's tunnel will have pedestals that are about 15 metres long with a height of 55 cm above the rail so that the first two doors of Stadtbahn trains will have step-less entry. This will make possible stepless entrance on lines S 4 / S 41 and S 5 / S 51 / S 52 in Karlsruhe for the first time, reflecting a trend that has long been standard elsewhere. The platforms cannot consistently have a height of 55 cm, because the tunnel will be used by trams and DC services of the Stadtbahn, which have an entry level on the modern lines of 34 cm.

At Marktplatz a stop will be built towards Ettlinger Straße on a line that was originally planned to be used by Stadtbahn trains to Wörth (S 5 / S 51 / S 52). This line runs currently on a loop through the central city and it is not certain whether the line will be used as originally planned.

Since line S 2 meets the Kaiserstraße at Durlacher Tor on Durlacher Allee, where there will be no entrance to the tunnel, it will be rerouted to branch off its current route at Hauptfriedhof and continue from there to Tullastraße.

Reconstruction of the Karlsruhe Hauptbahnhof forecourt
On the forecourt of Karlsruhe Central Station (Hauptbahnhof) there is a four-track station for trams and Stadtbahn DC-powered trains. Here there are platforms on both sides of the tracks. In the future, the heights of the platforms on the right hand side will remain at 34 cm (the height of platform for trams) and on the left they will be lifted to 55 cm. This will make possible level access to all modern trains.

Weather protection will also be improved as part of the rebuilding, with the provision of roofs over individual platforms.

Connection to Baden-Airpark 
For many years, a connection from Baden Airpark, the regional airport of Karlsruhe / Baden-Baden has been discussed. Initial planning focused on a route running via central Rastatt, Iffezheim and Hügelsheim, but there has been political opposition to this route in Rastatt. In recent years a route from Baden-Baden station to Baden-Airpark has been discussed along with continued discussion of a route from Rastatt, with or without crossing central Rastatt. Meanwhile, the results of the “standardised” cost–benefit analysis (Standardisierte Bewertung) used for German transport projects, show a moderately favourable value of 1.19 for the route via Baden station, and (a less favourable) value of 1.03 for the route from Rastatt generally along the route of the former Rastatt–Wintersdorf railway (of the former Mittelbadische Eisenbahnen).

Spöck–Karlsdorf-Neuthard–Bruchsal and Bruchsal–Hambrücken–Waghäusel 
An extension of line S2 from Spöck to central Bruchsal and from there towards Waghäusel is being examined. The route for this line, especially in the inner city of Bruchsal, is still controversial. Meanwhile, the affected communities have been given briefings on the planned route. The next step is expected to be the carrying out of a standardised assessment.

See also
 Verkehrsbetriebe Karlsruhe (VBK), the operating company for Karlsruhe city's Stadtbahn and tram lines
 Karlsruhe model, a tram-train developed and implemented by Karlsruher Verkehrsverbund (KVV), commencing service in 1992

References

External links
 Homepage of Albtal Verkehrs Gesellschaft mbH (AVG)
 Homepage of Karlsruher Verkehrsverbund (KVV)
 Homepage of Verkehrsbetriebe Karlsruhe (VBK)
 Karlsruher Stadtbahn in Stadtwiki Karlsruhe

 
Stadtbahn
S-Bahn in Germany
Tram transport in Germany
Light rail in Germany
750 V DC railway electrification
15 kV AC railway electrification